Senator Wentworth may refer to:

Asa Wentworth Jr. (1797–1882), Vermont State Senate
Jeff Wentworth (born 1940), Texas State Senate
Tappan Wentworth (1802–1875), Massachusetts State Senate